The GTA Grizzlies are a Canadian Junior Football League (CJFL) team located in Etobicoke, Ontario and representing the Greater Toronto Area. They play in the Ontario Football Conference (OFC) which is part of the CJFL and compete annually for the national title known as the Canadian Bowl.

History
The Grizzlies were originally founded in 2014 by a group that included general manager, Mark Houlder, and team president, Karen Escoffery. The team replaced the former Brampton Bears CJFL franchise, where Houlder was the head coach from 2010 to 2011, which operated from 2010 to 2013. While the two franchises are not related, many of the rights of former Bears players were transferred to the Grizzlies upon the team's creation. The team first began playing home games at Henry Carr Secondary School before moving to Centennial Park Stadium in 2015. 

After Houlder was elected as the First Vice President of the Ontario Football Conference to the CJFL Executive Board, Mike Leonard returned as the team's head coach, having previously held the title in 2018.

References

External links
Official website

Canadian Junior Football League teams
Canadian football teams in Ontario
Canadian football teams in Toronto
2014 establishments in Ontario
Sports clubs established in 2014